Orange High School is a government-funded co-educational comprehensive secondary day school, located in Orange, a city in the Central West region of New South Wales, Australia.

Established in 1912, the school enrolls approximately 1100 students from Year 7 to Year 12, of whom ten percent identified as Indigenous Australians The school is operated by the NSW Department of Education; and prepares students for the NSW Higher School Certificate (Year 12). The principal is Alison McLennan (REL).

History
Founded in 1912, Orange High School was the first state secondary school to be established in western New South Wales, and is one of two government secondary schools located in the city of Orange, the other being The Canobolas Rural Technology High School. The school's first classes were held in the School of Arts building, now the site of the Police and Community Youth Club in Byng Street. The school then moved to purpose-built facilities on the corner of March Street and Sale Street, which are now part of the TAFE complex.

Amongst the decisions made in the first year were for the school colours to be black and gold, the design of the school badge and the motto, "Quod Potero Sedulo" (translated from Latin as "Whatever I can do, I will do to the best of my ability").

Students were housed at the March Street school from 1913 through until 1958, at which time the High School and Rural School were merged. The current school buildings, sited on Woodward Street near the western end of the main street, Summer Street, were opened on 13 November 1959. During the opening ceremony, the Principal, Mr O'Sullivan, stated that in 1913 the total number of students enrolled was 93 with six teachers on staff. Presently the school caters for just under 1,100 students and has 70 teaching staff.

Co-curriculum

Music
The school has a music department and stages frequent concerts. It had a stage band, which was regarded as one of the best in the state. In addition to the stage band, the school had a concert band, a choir, and many other smaller ensembles. The stage band was placed first in division 2, two years running, at the South Australian Mount Gambier Generations in Jazz Festival sometime ago.

Sport
Students of Orange High School may choose to participate in a variety of sporting activities, including cricket, netball, rugby union, rugby league, soccer, softball, aerobics, badminton, and lawn bowls. The School participates in statewide competitions and maintains links with the traditional "Astley Cup" and "Malyney Shield".

All students take part in swimming and athletics carnivals, and the school also enters students in weekend competitions, including netball, hockey, softball and triathlon.

House system
As with most Australian schools, Orange High School has a house system for sport and administrative purposes. Students are divided into four houses upon their enrolment:
Bourke (dark green) -This house is Named after Richard Bourke
Elliott (yellow) 
Macquarie (dark blue) -This house is Named after Lachlan Macquarie
Parkes (red) - This house is named after Henry Parkes

Notable alumni 
 Murray Cookchildren's performer as a member of The Wiggles (also attended Endeavour High School)
 Sir Charles Cutlerformer politician; Former NSW Deputy Premier and Country Party leader
 David Fosternovelist, essayist, poet and farmer (also attended Armidale High School and Fort Street High School)
 Tim GartrellAustralian Labor Party National Secretary.  Gartrell was the school captain in 1988.
 Lisa Lackeyactress; roles in Home and Away from 1992 to 1995 and in NBCs series Heroes, Mulholland Drive
 Garry Westformer politician; public affairs consultant

See also 

 List of government schools in New South Wales
 Education in Australia

References

External links
 
New South Wales Department of Education and Training
 NSW Schools website

Educational institutions established in 1912
Orange, New South Wales
Public high schools in New South Wales
1912 establishments in Australia